The St Marys Saints are an Australian rugby league club who were formed in 1908. They were the founding Member of the Penrith District Rugby League. They have previously competed in the NSWRL Jim Beam Cup, winning three titles in the 1990s and in the NSWRL Premier League/State League as a former joint-venture club with their local rivals, the Penrith Panthers from 2002 until 2007. For a brief time, the Saints were known as the Cougars in the NSWRL Jim Beam Cup. The Club has since returned to its original name.

History

Rugby Union Roots

The St Marys Rugby League Club evolved from the St Marys United Rugby Union Club in 1908 and is the oldest Rugby League Club in the Penrith District Rugby League. St Marys United RUFC would play Rugby Union on a Saturday and back up again on a Sunday and play Rugby League against teams from the Sydney Competition on the paddocks where the St Marys High School is situated today. Their first A Grade Premiership was won in the Western Districts Junior League Competition in 1945.

Early Competitions and Quick Success

In 1947 Parramatta entered the NSW Rugby League Competition and St Marys joined their Junior League, winning the A Grade Competition in 1957, 1961–1963 and 1965.  They were also successful in winning the A Reserve Grade Competition in 1959 and again in 1964. Other successful teams were the D Grade, they won their first Premiership in 1957, and the F Grade won their Premiership in 1958 whilst the E Grade was successful in winning their competition in 1960.

Metro Cup

In 1967 St Marys became part of the Penrith Junior Rugby League when Penrith was accepted into the NSW Rugby League Competition. In 1970 just 3 years later St Marys entered teams in the Sydney 2nd Division Competition which was renamed the Metropolitan Cup in 1974 but the competition folded in 1976, the same year the Club won the Metropolitan Cup 2nd Grade Premiership. Because there was no Metropolitan Cup Competition in 1977 St Marys chose to enter teams in the Penrith Junior League winning their first ever A Grade Premiership in the Penrith Junior League the same year.

In 1991 the Club re-entered the Metropolitan Cup Competition again, which was reformed one year earlier, winning the First Grade Premierships in 1993—1994 and again in 2001, the Club was also successful in winning the 2nd Grade Premiership in 1995. The next year the Club decided that the Metropolitan Cup Competition had no direction; the competition was down to 7 teams and without any other teams interested in playing in the Metropolitan Cup Competition decided to withdraw its teams and concentrate on the Junior League.

Stadium issue

In 1950 the Club was still based at their old oval, Victoria Park, but was advised by the Penrith City Council that it would be turning the oval into a Garden Park and there would be no room for the St Marys Rugby League Club. The Club had now to decide on its immediate future as it had no choice but to look for another venue to play Rugby League and found a site where the Target Shopping Centre is situated today.

During 1995, unfortunately the Penrith Council were unable to find funds available so the St Marys Rugby League Club took it upon themselves to build a state of the art Rugby League Stadium at the rear of the Club at a cost of $6.25m which was totally funded by the Club, the Stadium was opened in January 2002.

Back in Topflight State Footy
In 2003 the Club went in a new direction and joined the Penrith Panthers in a joint venture merging into one Club known as the St Marys/Penrith Cougars. Together they entered a team in the Jim Beam Cup and Premier League competition. The joint venture in the Jim Beam Cup only lasted until the end of the 2005 season with the Premier League venture finishing up a year later when the Club was forced to withdraw its support because of the massive increase in poker machine tax and smoking restrictions. In spite of that the Junior League continues to become stronger especially over the past 10 years winning a record 11 Premierships in 2004 and again in 2007. On 26 September 2016, St Marys made the Ron Massey Cup Grand Final against Mount Pritchard Mounties but lost the match 36–16. On 24 September 2017, St Marys defeated Mounties to win the Sydney Shield competition in the grand final. In 2018, St Marys made the Ron Massey Cup grand final against defending premiers the Wentworthville Magpies but were defeated 38–4. In the 2019 Ron Massey Cup season, St Mary's made the grand final against Wentworthville in a rematch from the previous seasons decider.  St Mary's would again lose in the grand final by a score of 32-14 at Leichhardt Oval.
On 4 September 2022, St Mary's won the 2022 Sydney Shield competition, defeating Brothers Penrith 36-12 in the grand final.

Leagues Club

The Club's future meant that they had to find a site for a Licensed Rugby league Club and started working to achieve that goal. In 1956 the dreams of many of the St Marys people came true, the present Club was incorporated by merging the both Leagues Club and Junior League into one body to be known as the St Marys Rugby League Football Club Ltd. Since then, on legal advice, the word football was deleted and the Club is now known as the St Marys Rugby League Club Ltd. Originally the Club was going to build its licensed premises where the Target Shopping Centre is located but was advised by the Club Solicitors to sell the property and seek a more suitable site. In 1980 the site was sold and after a lot of negotiating 30ha was purchased where the Club is situated today. The Club then applied for a liquor licence which was finally granted in March 1982.

The actual building was constructed by a company known as Rennat Construction in very quick time to allow the Club to open for trading on Melbourne Cup Day 1982. Twenty five years have passed and the Club has had several renovations done since but none as outstanding as the recent remodelling and extension, it is a credit to the Board and Management the way the Club has been remodelled for the comfort of the members.

Famous players
St Marys has produced numerous notable players such as Darren South (St George Dragons), Luke Swain (Penrith Panthers), Dave and John Cartwright (Penrith Panthers), Bryce Cartwright (Gold Coast Titans), Ben McFadgean, Frank Puletua, Tony Puletua (Penrith Panthers), Tim Grant (Wests Tigers), Michael Jennings (Parramatta Eels), Geoff Daniela (Penrith Panthers), Willie Isa (Melbourne Storm), Daniel Penese (Penrith Panthers), Sonny Tuigamala (Sydney Roosters), John Nuumaalii, Moses Leota (Penrith Panthers), Peter Wallace (Penrith Panthers), Tyrell Fuimaono (South Sydney Rabbitohs), Brian To'o (Penrith Panthers), Christian Crichton (Canterbury-Bankstown Bulldogs)., Brent Naden (Canterbury Bankstown Bulldogs)

Honours
Ron Massey Cup
 Winners (3) 1993, 1994, 2001
 Minor Premiers (2) 2000, 2017
Sydney Shield
 Winners (1) 2017
Metropolitan Cup Reserve Grade
 Winners (2) 1976, 1995
 Minor Premiers (2) 1998, 2001
Western Districts Junior Rugby League 1908-1946
 A-Grade Winners (1) 1945 
Parramatta Districts Junior Rugby League 1947-1966
 A-Grade Winners (5) 1957, 1961, 1962, 1963, 1965
Penrith Districts Junior Rugby League 1967-present
 A-Grade Winners (16) 1977, 1978, 1980, 1984, 1987, 1990, 1993, 1995, 1999, 2000, 2002, 2005, 2007, 2010, 2013, 2015

Playing Record in NSWRL Competitions

Ron Massey Cup 
St Marys entered the Ron Massey Cup in 2016. The club had previously entered equivalent third tier competitions in the 1970s and 1990s through to 2001, and 2003.

Sydney Shield

Premier League 
In a joint venture with the Penrith Panthers during the mid 2000s, the club fielded a team, St Marys Penrith Cougars, in the second-tier Premier League.

See also

List of rugby league clubs in Australia
Rugby league in New South Wales

Sources

References

External links

Rugby league teams in New South Wales
Rugby league teams in Sydney
Rugby clubs established in 1908
1908 establishments in Australia
Ron Massey Cup